The British Australian (and) New Zealand Antarctic Research Expedition (BANZARE) was a research expedition into Antarctica between 1929 and 1931, involving two voyages over consecutive Austral summers. It was a British Commonwealth initiative, driven more by geopolitics than science, and funded by the United Kingdom, Australia and New Zealand.

The leader of the BANZARE was Sir Douglas Mawson and there were several subcommanders (Captain K.N. MacKenzie, who replaced Captain John King Davis for the second summer) on board the [RRS Discovery, the ship previously used by Robert Falcon Scott. The BANZARE, which also made several short flights in a small plane, mapped the coastline of Antarctica and discovered Mac. Robertson Land and Princess Elizabeth Land (which later was claimed as part of the Australian Antarctic Territory).

The voyages primarily comprised an "acquisitive exploratory expedition", with Mawson making proclamations of British sovereignty over Antarctic lands at each of their five landfalls—on the understanding that the territory would later be handed to Australia (as it was in 1933). One such proclamation was made on 5 January 1931 at Cape Denison, the site which Mawson's Australasian Antarctic Expedition had occupied in 1912–13. A hand-written copy of the proclamation was left at the site, enclosed in a container made of food tins and buried beneath a cairn. The letter was retrieved in 1977 by an Australian Antarctic expedition, and is part of the Mawson collection at the National Museum of Australia.

The BANZARE was also a scientific quest, producing 13 volumes of reports, on geology, oceanography, meteorology, terrestrial magnetism, zoology and botany, between 1937 and 1975. Robert Falla was the assistant zoologist.

See also
List of Antarctic expeditions

References

Sources

B.A.N.Z. Antarctic Research Expedition 1929–1931 Reports (1937–1975), Adelaide: BANZAR Expedition Committee & Mawson Institute for Antarctic Research, University of Adelaide.
Collis, Christy (2004) The Proclamation Island Moment: Making Antarctica Australian. Law Text Culture 8:1–18.
Price, A. Grenfell (1962) The Winning of Australian Antarctica: Mawson's BANZARE voyages, 1929–31: based on the Mawson Papers, Sydney: Angus & Robertson.

External links

 Douglas Mawson 1882–1958
 All features of Antarctica listed in one single *.TXT-File, provided by the United States Geological Survey (USGS) In this document, BANZARE appears often, a search for "BANZARE" shows which features BANZARE was involved with.

History of Antarctica
1929 in Antarctica
1930 in Antarctica
1931 in Antarctica
Antarctic expeditions
Australia and the Antarctic
New Zealand and the Antarctic
United Kingdom and the Antarctic
1929 in Australia
Expeditions from New Zealand
Expeditions from the United Kingdom